Same-sex marriage in Nova Scotia has been legal since September 24, 2004 when the province began issuing marriage licences to same-sex couples immediately following a court ruling from the Nova Scotia Supreme Court. Nova Scotia became the sixth jurisdiction in Canada, and the ninth worldwide after the Netherlands, Belgium, Ontario, British Columbia, Quebec, Massachusetts, Yukon, and Manitoba, to legalise same-sex marriage.

Background

In November 2000, the Nova Scotia House of Assembly approved the Law Reform (2000) Act (its long title being An Act to Comply with Certain Court Decisions and to Modernize and Reform Laws in the Province), establishing domestic partnerships. The act was assented by the Lieutenant Governor of Nova Scotia, Myra Freeman, and went into force on June 4, 2001. Domestic partnerships grant cohabiting couples many of the rights and obligations of marriage, including pension benefits, inheritance, and the ability to divide property or other assets at separation or death. These partnerships differ from common law marriages in that they are registered with the state and the property rights of domestic partners are better defined. Both partners must be 19 or older, resident in Nova Scotia for the past 3 months, and not currently married or in a partnership with another individual. Both opposite-sex and same-sex couples can enter into a domestic partnership.

In July 2001, the Nova Scotia Supreme Court concluded that the provision in the Adoption Act which prevented common-law couples from adopting was unconstitutional; the result been that common-law couples, either same-sex or opposite-sex, are now able to adopt children jointly. Madame Justice Deborah Gass ruled that "prohibiting a joint adoption where all the evidence indicates these adults are providing optimum care and loving... defeats the very purpose of the legislation". A spokeswoman for Egale Canada said, "It really is a victory for the expansion of the definition of family and that courts recognize families exist beyond married couples and their children."

Court ruling
Following the court ruling legalizing same-sex marriage in Yukon in July 2004, Sean Foreman, chairperson of a local LGBT group, said "We are now considering a change in strategy, to proceed with a similar application in Nova Scotia in the near future, rather than wait for the Reference." Foreman also asked the federal and provincial attorneys general, Irwin Cotler and Michael Baker, to "immediately begin issuing marriage licenses to same-sex couples", but this was not successful. On August 13, 2004, three same-sex couples brought the suit Boutilier et al. v. Canada (A.G) and Nova Scotia (A.G) against the provincial and federal governments requesting that they be issued marriage licences. The partners who brought the suit were Brian Mombourquette and Ross Boutelier, Kim Vance and Samantha Meehan (who had married in Toronto in 2003 and sought recognition of their marriage at home in Nova Scotia), and Ron and Bryan Garnett-Doucette. The couples were represented by Foreman, also a lawyer at the law firm Wickwire Holm in Halifax. Premier John Hamm said the provincial government would not oppose the court bid.

On September 24, 2004, Justice Heather Robertson of the Nova Scotia Supreme Court ruled that the ban on same-sex marriages violated the Canadian Charter of Rights and Freedoms and ordered the province to recognize same-sex unions. Ron and Bryan Garnett-Doucette were the first same-sex couple to obtain a marriage licence in Nova Scotia, receiving a licence in Halifax just hours after the ruling was handed down. They said, "We feel really, really good. It's a great day to be a Nova Scotian." Neither the federal nor the provincial governments opposed the ruling, continuing the trend set with the Yukon and Manitoba rulings. Attorney General Baker said, "We certainly did not want to waste taxpayers' money.", and Premier Hamm said the province would abide by the court's decision. The leader of the Opposition, Darrell Dexter, praised the court ruling. Terrence Prendergast, the Archbishop of Halifax, condemned the court decision, stating that "marriage is a natural institution that precedes all social, legal and religious systems", "We must recognize this decision as the end of state support for marriage as we have always known it."

Provincial legislation
An odd proviso to the post-ruling status was that, until a formal change to the provincial Solemnization of Marriage Act, the Minister of Justice still required the terms "husband and wife" to be used by justices of the peace in any wedding. This stance by the Justice Ministry was categorized by some as heterosexist. Shortly afterwards, following warnings of further legal action by the couples' lawyer, the policy was changed to remove that requirement. The Solemnization of Marriage Act, however, was not modified to this effect. Only in October 2017 did the House of Assembly approve a bill replacing references to "husband and wife" in the Act with the gender-neutral term "spouses". The bill passed its third reading on 20 October and received royal assent by Lieutenant Governor Arthur LeBlanc six days later.

Marriage statistics
The 2016 Canadian census showed that there were 2,250 same-sex couples living in Nova Scotia. 126 same-sex marriages were solemnized in the province in 2017, accounting for 3% of all marriages, with 87 (69%) of these being between lesbian couples.

Religious performance
In July 2019, the synod of the Anglican Church of Canada passed a resolution known as "A Word to the Church", allowing its dioceses to choose whether to perform same-sex marriages. In September of the same year, Bishop Ron Cutler of the Diocese of Nova Scotia and Prince Edward Island issued a pastoral letter allowing local parishes to perform same-sex marriages.

See also
Same-sex marriage in Canada
LGBT rights in Canada

Notes

References

External links

Nova Scotia
Politics of Nova Scotia
Nova Scotia law
LGBT in Nova Scotia
2004 in LGBT history